Charles Whitwell (ca. 1568 1611) was an English scientific instrument maker.

An English engraver and maker of mathematical instruments in the tradition of Humphrey Cole (c. 1530 1591) and active between 1591 and 1606, Whitwell engraved maps of English counties and built many instruments that were invented by Robert Dudley (1573 1649). These instruments, brought to Florence by Robert Dudley himself, were bequeathed to Ferdinand II de' Medici (1610 1670) and are now in the possession of the Museo Galileo of Florence.

References

External links 

British scientific instrument makers
16th-century English people